The 1905 North Donegal by-election was a parliamentary by-election held for the United Kingdom House of Commons constituency of North Donegal on 15 June 1905. The vacancy arose because of the death of the sitting member, William O'Doherty of the Irish Parliamentary Party. Only one candidate was nominated, John Muldoon representing the Irish Parliamentary Party, who was elected unopposed.

Result

References

1905 elections in the United Kingdom
June 1905 events
By-elections to the Parliament of the United Kingdom in County Donegal constituencies
Unopposed by-elections to the Parliament of the United Kingdom in Irish constituencies
1905 elections in Ireland